Completed: 1997–2001 is a discography compilation album released in 2005 by American screamo band Jeromes Dream on Alone Records. The album consists of the band's entire recorded history up to that point, including previously unreleased material.

Track listing

Personnel
Jeromes Dream
Jeff Smith - vocals, bass
Nick Antonopoulos - guitar
Eric Ratensperger - drums

Production
Johnathan P. Herbert - recording (Seeing Means More Than Safety)
Kurt Ballou - recording, production (Seeing Means More Than Safety, Presents)
Will Killingsworth - recording (Split 5" with The Book of Dead Names)

References

2005 compilation albums
Jeromes Dream albums